Gotzman (Götzmann, Gotzmann, Goetzman) is a German surname. Notable people with this surname include:

Andreas Gotzmann (born 1960), German historian
Gary Goetzman (born 1952), American television producer
Jutta Götzmann (born 1965), German art historian
 (born 1957), German drummer
H. J. Goetzman, early 20th century photographic studio proprietor in Alaska

Surnames
Surnames of German origin
German-language surnames
Surnames from given names